André Béhotéguy (19 October 1900 – 17 August 1960) was a French rugby union player who competed in the 1924 Summer Olympics. He was born in Bayonne and died in Nice. In 1924 he won the silver medal as member of the French team.

References

External links
André Béhotéguy's profile at databaseOlympics
André Béhotéguy's profile at Sports Reference.com

1900 births
1960 deaths
Sportspeople from Bayonne
French rugby union players
Olympic rugby union players of France
Rugby union players at the 1924 Summer Olympics
Olympic silver medalists for France
French-Basque people
France international rugby union players
Aviron Bayonnais players
Medalists at the 1924 Summer Olympics